Burj-e-Roshnai is located in Peshawar, Khyber Pakhtunkhwa province, Pakistan. There are two historical tombs located in Kotla Mohsin Khan, Peshawar, they are called Burj-e-Roshnai. They are one of the great architectural signs of the Mughal dynasty.

References

Tourist attractions in Peshawar
Mughal architecture